Saint Louis College of San Fernando  also referred to by its acronym SLC is a private Catholic coeducational basic and higher education institution run by the Congregation of the Immaculate Heart of Mary in the City of San Fernando, La Union, Philippines. It was founded in 1964 by the CICM missionaries.

There are also sister schools of SLC, like Saint Louis University (SLU) in Baguio, University of Saint Louis Tuguegarao (USL) in Tuguegarao, Saint Louis College of Cebu in Mandaue, Saint Mary's University (Philippines) in Bayombong, Nueva Vizcaya, and Maryhill School of Theology in Quezon City.

History
Saint Louis College of San Fernando, La Union, traces its roots from its humble beginnings in 1948 when Msgr. Anselmo Lazo, the parish priest then of San Fernando, La Union, founded Father Burgos College, which occupied the building just south of Saint William's Cathedral.

On the first year of operation as Fr. Burgos College, the High School Department accepted only first year and second year male enrollees. The College department on the other hand initially offered only four courses: four-year Education Course, two-year courses on Liberal arts and Commerce, and one-year Secretarial course.

In 1964, the Diocese of San Fernando turned over the ownership and management of Fr. Burgos College to the Congregation of the Immaculate Heart of Mary (CICM). Father Alfred Spincemaille, CICM was appointed as the first Rector.

In 1967, the school was renamed Saint Louis College of San Fernando and was transferred to Carlatan, San Fernando, La Union, its current location.

Academic programs

Graduate school
Doctor of Education (Ed.D.)
Doctor of Philosophy in Management (Ph.D.)
Master of Arts in Education (MAEd)
Master in Business Administration (MBA)
Master in Public Administration (MPA)

College of Arts and Sciences, Teacher Education & Information Technology with Criminology
Bachelor of Arts (AB)
Majors: English, Mathematics, Political Science, Public Administration
Bachelor of Science in Secondary Education (BSEd) majors: English, Biological Science, Filipino, Mathematics, Religious & Values Education, Physical Education
Bachelor in Elementary Education (BEEd)
Bachelor of Science in Information Technology (BSIT)
Bachelor of Science in Mathematics (BS Math)
Bachelor in Library and Information Science (BLIS)
Bachelor of Science in Psychology (BS PSych)
Bachelor of Science in Criminology (BS Crim)
Bachelor of Laws (LLB)

College of Commerce, Secretarial and Accountancy

Accountancy
Programs Offered:
Bachelor of Science in Accountancy (BSA)
Bachelor of Science in Accounting Technology (BSAT)
Certificate of Associate in Accounting Technology (CAAT)

Business Administration
Programs Offered:
Bachelor of Science in Business Administration (BSBA) major in: Financial Management (FinMan); Human Resource Development Management (HRDM); Marketing Management (MakMan); Operations Management (OpMan)

Office Administration
Programs Offered:
Bachelor of Science in Office Administration (BSOA)
Computer Secretarial Certificate (CSC)

Hotel and Restaurant Management and Tourism Management
Programs Offered:
Bachelor of Science in Hotel and Restaurant Management (BSHRM - Ladderized):Housekeeping NC II; Commercial Cooking NC II; Baking and Pastry Production NC II; Front Office NC II; Food and Beverage Service NC II;Bartending NC II
Bachelor of Science in Tourism Management (BSTM - Ladderized):Commercial Cooking NC II;Travel Services NC II

College of Engineering and Architecture
Programs Offered:
Bachelor of Science in Civil Engineering (BSCE)
Bachelor of Science in Architecture (BSAr)
Bachelor of Science in Industrial Engineering (BSIE)
Certificate in Building Construction Techniques (CBCT)
Certificate in Architectural Drafting (CAD)

See also
Saint Louis University, Baguio
Saint Louis College La Union, San Fernando, La Union
University of Saint Louis Tuguegarao, Tuguegarao, Cagayan Valley]]
Saint Mary's University, Bayombong, Nueva Vizcaya

External links
Saint Louis College La Union

Universities and colleges in La Union
San Fernando, La Union